This article attempts to list the oldest buildings in the state of Maine in the United States of America, including the oldest houses in Maine and any other surviving structures from the First Period or oldest buildings of their type in Maine.  Some dates are approximate and based on architectural studies and historical records, other dates are based on dendrochronology. All entries should include citation with reference to: architectural features; a report by an architectural historian; dendrochronology; or other secondary source.

Verified through dendrochronology or architectural surveys

Currently unverified estimates

See also 
List of the oldest buildings in the United States
 Timeline of architectural styles

Notes 

Maine
Oldest buildings